The Mid Gippsland Football League is an Australian rules football and netball league in the Latrobe Valley and South Gippsland regions of Victoria, Australia.

History
The Mid Gippsland Football League (MGFL) was founded in April, 1935.

The MGFL superseded the former Morwell & Yallourn Football League (M&YFL) with the following six clubs moving across to play in this new football competition in 1935 - Boolarra, Brown Coal Mine, Morwell Bridge, Morwell Seconds, Yallourn Imperials and Yinnar. The M&YFL subsequently folded prior to the 1935 season. The two remaining clubs in the M&YFL - Trafalgar Meadows FC (admitted into the M&YFL in 1934) and Willowgrove FC (admitted into the M&YFL in 1933) appear to have folded as a result.

In 1936, both Haunted Hills FC and Thorpdale FC joined the MGFL. Morwell Bridge FC dropped out the MFGL and went into recess, leaving seven clubs in 1936.

Morwell Bridge FC reformed & re-entered the MGFL in 1937.

In 1940, Brown Coal Mine, Herne's Creek and Yallourn Imperials all disbanded due to a lack of players caused by many footballers enlisting in the war, leaving just four teams remaining - Morwell Bridge, Morwell Seconds, Thorpdale and Yinnar.

In 1947, Brown Coal Mine FC (BCM) entered two teams in the MGFL - BMC Imperials and BCM Rovers. 

Yarragon transferred to the EDFL in 2018 with Trafalgar doing the same in 2019 and Yallourn Yallourn North moving to the NGFL that same year.

In 2021, six Alberton clubs (Tarwin, Foster, Stony Creek, MDU, Fish Creek and Toora) joined the MGFL.   The 2021 season was shut down by order of the Victorian State Government.

The first completed season after the pandemic was in 2022, Yinnar won the premiership.

League Football Records

Clubs

Current Clubs

Former Clubs

List of Premiers (since 1935)

List of Junior Premiers (Since 1964)

List of Seniors and Reserves Best & Fairests

List of Thirds and Fourths Best & Fairests

Leading Goal Kickers

2000 Ladder

2001 Ladder

2002 Ladder

2003 Ladder

2004 Ladder

2005 Ladder

2006 Ladder

2007 Ladder

2008 Ladder

2009 Ladder

2010 Ladder

2011 Ladder

2012 Ladder

2013 Ladder

2014 Ladder

2015 Ladder

2016 Ladder

2017 Ladder

2022 Ladder 
   
   
Finals

References

Further reading

External links
Official Mid Gippsland Football League Website
Full Points Footy -Mid Gippsland Football League

Australian rules football competitions in Victoria (Australia)
Gippsland (region)